Jure Jerbić (born 28 June 1990) is a Croatian football player, who played for NK Zadar in the Treća HNL jug.

References
 Jure Jerbić napustio Zadar i pronašao angažman u inozemstvu 
 Jure Jerbić at Soccerway

1990 births
Living people
Sportspeople from Zadar
Association football central defenders
Croatian footballers
NK Zadar players
HNK Cibalia players
Croatian Football League players
First Football League (Croatia) players
Second Football League (Croatia) players
Croatian expatriate footballers
Expatriate footballers in North Macedonia
Croatian expatriate sportspeople in North Macedonia